A Roman  (plural ) was originally a Roman outpost established in conquered territory to secure it. Eventually, however, the term came to denote the highest status of a Roman city. It is also the origin of the modern term colony.

Characteristics

Under the Roman Republic, which had no standing army, bodies of their own citizens were planted in conquered towns as a kind of garrison. There were two types:

 Roman colonies, coloniae civium Romanorum or coloniae maritimae, as they were often built near the sea, e.g. Ostia (350 BC) and Rimini (268 BC). The colonists consisted of about three hundred Roman families and were given a small plot of land so were probably small business owners.  

 Latin colonies (coloniae Latinae) were considerably larger than Roman colonies. They were military strongholds near or in enemy territory. The colonists were given large estates up to 35 hectares. They lost their citizenship which they could regain if they returned to Rome.

After 133 BC tribunes introduced reforms to support the urban poor to become farmers again in new colonies as agricultural settlements (e.g. Tarentum in 122 BC).

Under Caesar and Augustus thousands of Roman legionary veterans were granted lands in many coloniae in the empire and were responsible for the Romanization of many territories (mainly in the spread of Latin language and of Roman laws and customs).

History

According to Livy, Rome's first colonies were established in about 752 BC at Antemnae and Crustumerium, both in Latium.

Other early colonies were established at Signia in the 6th century BC, Velitrae and Norba in the 5th century BC, and Ostia, Antium, and Tarracina in the late 4th century.  In this first period of colonization, which lasted down to the end of the Punic Wars, colonies were primarily military in purpose, being intended to defend Roman territory, afterwards they became large centeres for the migration of the Italic people, especially in Roman north Africa which had the largest density of Roman colonies per region basis in the Roman Empire, there, the Italic population constituted more than one third of the total population during the second century A.D and the total population of the region was fully Romanized and embraced the Roman religions (Roman Pantheon and Christianity).

There were colonies of citizens and colonies of Latins, which differed in size, constitution, and region.  Colonies of citizens were typically coastal and known as coloniae maritimae.  These were small (three hundred families), close to Rome, and enjoyed no civic life of their own. Sherwin-White suggested that they were similar to the Athenian cleruchy. The Latin colonies (coloniae juris latini), on the other hand, were much larger and populated by Latins, as well as by Romans who, however, did not retain Roman citizenship. The first Latin colonies were initially founded by the Latin league.

During the Late Republic, prominent figures such as the tribune Gaius Gracchus proposed to settle Rome's landless citizens in colonies of recently conquered provinces. This concept, though popular and frequently reiterated by Roman contemporaries, failed to gain traction. Large scale settlement of landless Roman citizens in provinces would never really occur in the Roman Empire.

The first Roman colony outside Italy was probably Italica in Hispania founded in 206 BC by Publius Cornelius Scipio during the Second Carthaginian War.

Under the Kingdom

BC 752 at Antemnae and Crustumerium, both in Latium.
BC 745 (or 737) Fidenae became a Roman colony
BC 737 Cameria

Under the Republic

BC 396 Veii and Fidenae defeated. 4 new tribus [election district] organised (Stellatina, Tromentana, Sabatina, Arniensis) 
BC 385 Satricum (lost and burned in BC 346) 
BC 354–349 Tibur, Praeneste, Caere(Latium) alliance agreement 
BC 332 (or after): Sutrium, Nepete (Latium), 
BC 338 Ostia colony and port
New bilateral defence contracts with Falerii, Tarquinii (Etruria) Caere (again), Pomptina and Poplilia tribus (tribes) formed in territories of Antium
BC 338 Capua inhabitants got Roman civil rights 
BC 335 Cales (Latium) 
BC 332 (two new voting tribus established): Scaptia, Maecia
BC 329 Anxur (Latium) 
BC 318 Falerna tribus established, Cales made contract with Rome again
BC 318 Canusium (Apulia) 
New Roman municipiums made from small towns around Rome: Aricia, Lanuvium, Nomentum, Pedum, Tusculum. Latin ius contracts made with Tibur, Praeneste, Lavinium, Cora (Latium) 
Ius comercii contracts made with Circei, Notba, Setia, Signia, Nepi, Ardea, Gabii
Ius migrationi and ius connubii
Ufentina tribus established (on territories of Volscus city Antium), Privernum, Velitrae, Terracia, Fondi and Fotmiae made contract with Rome (cives sine suffragio) 
BC 303 Alba Fucens, Carsioli (Latium) 
BC 313 Suessula, Saticula (Campania) 
BC 315 Luceria (Apulia) 
BC 303 Sora (Latium) 
BC 299 Nequinum (Narnia/Narni in Etruria and Umbria) was a keypoint fortress against the Samnis tribes
BC 296 Minturnae (Latium) 
BC 291 Venusia (Apulia) colonia (20,000 male inhabitants) to control the Samnis tribes
BC 290 Pinceum besieged and occupied, soon became a Roman colony
BC 290(?) Hatri (Atria) by Adriatic sea (Abruzzo) 
BC 269 Castrum Novum Picenii in BC 286), BC 264(?) Picenum colonies (Abruzzo) 
BC 289 (or in BC 283) Sena Gallica (Umbria)  
BC 273 Paestum (Latium) 
BC 273 Cosa (Etruria) 
BC 268 Beneventum (Samnium) 
BC 268 Ariminum (Aemilia) 
BC 268 Brundisium (Apulia) 
BC 264 Firmum
BC 263 Aesernia (Samnium)
BC 247 Alsium (Etruria) 
BC 245 Fregenae (Etruria) 
BC 222 Mediolanum (Transoadana) 
BC 218 Placentia (Aemilia) 
BC 218 Cremona (Venetia et Histria) 
BC 197–192 Volturnum, Liternum, Puteoli, Salernum (Campania) Sipontum, Buxentum (Calabria) 
BC 196 Brixia (Venetia et Histria) 
BC 193 Copia (Lucania et Bruttii) 
BC 192 Vibo Valentia (Lucania et Bruttii) 
BC 189 Bononia (Aemilia) 
BC 184 Pisaurum (Umbria), Potentia Romanorum (Lucania et Bruttii) 
BC 183 Mutina, Parma (Aemilia) 
BC 181 Aquilea (Venetia es Histria) Gravisca (Latium) 
BC 180 Portus Pisanus  (Etruria) 
BC 177 Luna (Etruria) 
BC 125 Pollentia, Vardacate (Liguria) 
BC 123–118 Hasta, Dertona (Liguria)  
BC 100 Eporedia (Transpadana, today Piemonte region)
BC 36 Tauromenium	(Sicily)
BC 21 Catina (Sicily)
BC 21 Syracusæ (Sicily)
BC 21 Thermæ (Sicily)
BC 21 Tyndaris (Sicily)

Under the Principate 

Colonies were not founded on a large scale until the inception of the Principate. Augustus, who needed to settle over a hundred thousand of his veterans after the end of his civil wars, began a massive colony creation program throughout his empire. However, not all colonies were new cities. Many were created from already-occupied settlements and the process of colonization just expanded them. Some of these colonies would later grow into large cities (modern day Cologne was first founded as a Roman colony). During this time, provincial cities can gain the rank of colony, gaining certain rights and privileges. After the era of the Severan emperors the new "colonies" were only cities that were granted a status (often of tax exemption), and in most cases during the Late Imperial times there was no more settlement of retired legionaries.

Effects and legacy of colonization 
Roman colonies sometimes served as a potential reserve of veterans which could be called upon during times of emergency. However, these colonies more importantly served to produce future Roman citizens and therefore recruits to the Roman army.

Roman colonies played a major role in the spread of the Latin language within the central and southern Italian peninsula during the early empire. The colonies showed surrounding native populations an example of Roman life.

Examples

See also
Local government (ancient Roman)
Duumviri
Roman colonies in antiquity
List of ancient cities in Thrace and Dacia
List of ancient cities in Illyria

References

Further reading
 Bradley, Guy, and John-Paul Wilson, eds. 2006. Greek and Roman Colonization: Origins, Ideologies and Interactions. Swansea, UK: Classical Press of Wales.
 Broadhead, William. 2007. "Colonization, Land Distribution, and Veteran Settlement." In A Companion to the Roman Army. Edited by Paul Erdkamp, 148–163. Blackwell Companions to the Ancient World. Malden, MA: Blackwell.
 Crawford, Michael H. 2014. "The Roman History of Roman Colonisation." In The Roman Historical Tradition: Regal and Republican Rome. Oxford Readings in Classical Studies. Edited by James H. Richardson and Federico Santangelo.  Oxford; New York:  Oxford University Press.
 Curchin, Leonard A. 1991. Roman Spain: Conquest and Assimilation. London: Routledge.
 Fuhrmann, Christopher J. 2012. Policing the Roman Empire: Soldiers, Administration, and Public Order. Oxford and New York: Oxford Univ. Press.
 Salmon, Edward T. 1955. "Roman Expansion and Roman Colonization in Italy." Phoenix 9.2: 63–75.
 Stek, Tesse D. and Gert-Jan Burgers eds. 2015. The Impact of Rome on Cult Places and Religious Practices in Ancient Italy. Bulletin of the Institute of Classical Studies Supplement 132.   London:  Institute of Classical Studies, University of London.
 Sears, Gareth. 2011. The Cities of Roman Africa. Stroud, UK: History Press.
 Termeer, Marleen K. 2010. "Early Colonies in Latium (ca 534–338 BC): A Reconsideration of Current Images and the Archaeological Evidence." Bulletin Antieke Beschaving 85:43–58.
 Woolf, Greg. 1998. Becoming Roman: The Origins of Provincial Civilization in Gaul. Oxford: Oxford Univ. Press.

External links

Jona Lendering, “Coloniae”, Livius.org (2006)
L. Adkins and R.A. Adkins, “Coloniae”, in L. Adkins and R.A. Adkins, Handbook to Life in Ancient Rome, New York, 1994.
M. Bunson, “colonies, Roman”, in M. Bunson, Encyclopedia of the Roman Empire, New York, 1994.

 
Rome
Ancient Roman geography
Veterans' settlement schemes